Sarangi (also Romanized as Sarangī; also known as Sarangar, Sarangū, Sarānjeh, and Sarengīl) is a village in Horjand Rural District, Kuhsaran District, Ravar County, Kerman Province, Iran. At the 2006 census, its population was 38, in 10 families.

References 

Populated places in Ravar County